The 1910 Iowa State Senate elections took place as part of the biennial 1910 United States elections. Iowa voters elected state senators in 22 of the state senate's 50 districts. State senators serve four-year terms in the Iowa State Senate.

A statewide map of the 50 state Senate districts in the 1910 elections is provided by the Iowa General Assembly here.

The primary election on June 7, 1910, determined which candidates appeared on the November 8, 1910 general election ballot.

Following the previous election, Republicans had control of the Iowa Senate with 34 seats to Democrats' 16 seats.

To claim control of the chamber from Republicans, the Democrats needed to net 10 Senate seats.

Republicans maintained control of the Iowa State Senate following the 1910 general election with the balance of power remaining unchanged with Republicans holding 34 seats and Democrats having 16 seats.

Summary of Results
Note: The 28 holdover Senators not up for re-election are not listed on this table.

Source:

Detailed Results
NOTE: The 28 districts that did not hold elections in 1910 are not listed here.

Note: If a district does not list a primary, then that district did not have a competitive primary (i.e., there may have only been one candidate file for that district).

District 1

District 7

District 9

District 10

District 12

District 13

District 17

District 18

District 20

District 21

District 22

District 29

District 30

District 34

District 35

District 37

District 38

District 42

District 44

District 45

District 48

District 50

See also
 United States elections, 1910
 United States House of Representatives elections in Iowa, 1910
 Elections in Iowa

References

1910 Iowa elections
Iowa Senate
Iowa Senate elections